Tigermilk is the 1996 debut album from Scottish pop group Belle and Sebastian. Originally given a limited release (1,000 copies) by Electric Honey, the album was subsequently re-released in 1999 by Jeepster Records.

The album is named after an instrumental that did not end up on the album – it was later performed on Belle and Sebastian's early tours.  All of the songs on the album were written by Stuart Murdoch between 1993 and 1996, and originally performed solo on the Glasgow open mic circuit. Though he performs on the album, trumpet player Mick Cooke was not then an official member of the band.

Recording and production
At the time Stuart Murdoch began recruiting musicians for the band, drummer Richard Colburn was in a Music Business course at Stow College with professor Alan Rankine. Each year the class would produce one record on the college's Electric Honey label as an example to use in the course. Murdoch and Colburn provided a demo tape the group had recorded (later released as the Dog on Wheels EP) and the college was extremely impressed and chose to support them in creating a full album.

Stuart Murdoch recalls that the group was still quite loose knit at the time Tigermilk was recorded and that the full ensemble had not played together before getting into the studio. Many of the supporting instrument parts were shaped as the group recorded. After recording, though, "we were a group, no question."

The album's cover photograph was taken by Stuart Murdoch and features Joanne Kenney (his girlfriend at the time). Kenney also appeared on the cover of the Dog on Wheels EP.

Legacy
Tigermilk has sold over 124,000 copies. Pitchfork included "The State I Am In" at number 17 on their Top 200 Tracks of the 1990s. The album was included in the book 1001 Albums You Must Hear Before You Die.

An Ebay charity auction of the stuffed animal in the cover art of the Tigermilk album in 2019  was won by Lisa Carr of Washington, DC.  Lisa Carr had also previously won an auction for bandleader Stuart Murdoch's car in 2002  and an auction of the stuffed animal on the cover of Dog on Wheels in 2004.

Track listing

Personnel
 Stuart Murdoch – vocals, guitar, programming on "Electronic Renaissance"
 Stuart David – bass
 Isobel Campbell – cello
 Chris Geddes – keyboards, piano
 Richard Colburn – drums
 Stevie Jackson – guitar
 Mick Cooke – trumpet
 Joe Togher – violin
 Keith Jones – Korg Poly-61 synthesizer, sound manipulation on "Electronic Renaissance"

References

External links
 Album info

1996 debut albums
Belle and Sebastian albums
Electric Honey (label) albums